Rafael Wihby Bracali (born 5 May 1981) is a Brazilian professional footballer who plays as a goalkeeper for Portuguese club Boavista. He also holds Italian citizenship.

Club career
Born in Santos, São Paulo, Bracali started playing professionally for local Paulista Futebol Clube. In 2006, he moved to Portugal and signed with C.D. Nacional in Madeira. After backing up Diego Benaglio in his first season and appearing in 14 Primeira Liga games in the second, he became first choice after the Swiss transferred to VfL Wolfsburg.

Bracali did not miss one single league match from 2008 to 2011. He was set to sign for fellow top-division side S.C. Braga in June 2011, but the deal eventually fell through. 

In August 2011, Bracali replaced the departed Beto as understudy at FC Porto, behind compatriot Helton. He made his only league appearance for the Dragons on 12 May 2012 in the last game of a victorious campaign, a 5–2 win at Rio Ave F.C. in which he was substituted late on for fellow debutant Kadú. He was then loaned to S.C. Olhanense where he played more frequently, and the team avoided relegation by one point.

On 13 July 2015, after two years in the Super League Greece with Panetolikos FC, Bracali agreed a two-year deal with F.C. Arouca. A year after the club's relegation, on 29 June 2018 he returned to the top flight and the city of Porto by signing for Boavista F.C. on a two-year contract. 

Bracali agreed to an extension at the Estádio do Bessa until 30 June 2021 in August 2019, aged 38.

Personal life
Bracali's father, Armando, was also a footballer and a goalkeeper. After notably representing Clube Atlético Juventus in the 1970s, he worked mainly as a goalkeeping coach at Paulista.

Honours
Paulista
Copa do Brasil: 2005

Porto
Primeira Liga: 2011–12
Supertaça Cândido de Oliveira: 2011

References

External links

1981 births
Living people
Sportspeople from Santos, São Paulo
Brazilian footballers
Association football goalkeepers
Campeonato Brasileiro Série A players
Campeonato Brasileiro Série B players
Paulista Futebol Clube players
Esporte Clube Juventude players
Primeira Liga players
Liga Portugal 2 players
C.D. Nacional players
FC Porto players
S.C. Olhanense players
F.C. Arouca players
Boavista F.C. players
Super League Greece players
Panetolikos F.C. players
Brazilian expatriate footballers
Expatriate footballers in Portugal
Expatriate footballers in Greece
Brazilian expatriate sportspeople in Portugal
Brazilian expatriate sportspeople in Greece